{|
|}

The Jonker JS-1 Revelation is a glider built of glass-fibre, carbon fibre and Kevlar. It is available with an 18-metre span for the 18 metre class or a 21-metre span for the Open class. The manufacturer is Jonker Sailplanes of Potchefstroom South Africa, founded in 2004 by two brothers, Attie and Uys Jonker. The structural and chief designer is Attie Jonker, while the airfoil and main aerodynamic features were developed by Johan Bosman in co-operation with the Delft University of Technology.

18 metre versions

The wing has full-span flaperons, an elliptical planform and uses winglets. It is in 4 pieces, each tip is 1.5 metres. Two novel features are:
 a double-hole blowing/suction system in the wings to minimise drag. The two rows of blow holes on the lower surface prevent turbulent flow at specific locations for different flap settings, thus reducing drag
 a jet engine for the self-sustaining version. A self-launching version was considered but it was decided that the fuselage would require extensive structural modification.

The first flight of the JS-1 was on 12 December 2006.  Series production then started and up to July 2012 about 34 had been produced

Attie Jonker won the 18 metre class South African National Championship in 2008 with a JS-1 Revelation.

21 metre version
A new version, JS1C-21m, with 3 metre wing-tips, which increase the span to 21 metres, has been developed. The first flight was on 22 March 2012. Because of the higher wing loads and increased maximum take-off mass of 720 kg (increased from 600 kg), the wing/wingtip junction has been redesigned including stronger wing spar caps and thicker wing-tip spars.  All future JS1 Revelations will be compatible with the optional 21m wing-tips.

The new wing-tips have water tanks each with a capacity of 17 litres of ballast which can be jettisoned separately from the main wing and fin tanks.

Theoretical performance gives a claimed best glide of around 1:60 and, with the maximum wing loading of 58.7 kg/m2 and the polar remaining flat at high cruise speeds, the manufacturers state that it is competitive at the highest level with other Open Class gliders. The results (2nd, 3rd and three other places in the top ten in the 2014 World Gliding Championships Open Class)  supports this assertion.

EASA certification
The JS1-C is certificated in Europe by M&D Flugzeugbau as the JS-MD Single, with a retractable MD-TJ42 turbojet engine mounted behind the cockpit.

Variants
JS-1
18 meter wingspan prototypes
JS-1B
18 meter wingspan  18 metre class competition glider, production version.
JS-1C
21 meter wingspan Open class competition glider

Specifications (JS-1B)

See also

Notes

References

External links
Jonker Sailplanes

2000s South African sailplanes
T-tail aircraft